The Heliconiinae, commonly called heliconians or longwings, are a subfamily of the brush-footed butterflies (family Nymphalidae). They can be divided into 45–50 genera and were sometimes treated as a separate family Heliconiidae within the Papilionoidea. The colouration is predominantly reddish and black, and though of varying wing shape, the forewings are always elongated tipwards, hence the common name.

Most longwings are found in the Tropics, particularly in South America; only the Argynnini are quite diverse in the Holarctic. Especially tropical species feed on poisonous plants, characteristically Passifloraceae vines, as larvae, becoming poisonous themselves. The adult butterflies announce their acquired toxicity with strong aposematic colours, warning off would-be predators. There are several famous cases of Batesian and Müllerian mimicry both within this group and with other butterflies. Other commonly seen food plants are Fabaceae (which also contain several toxic species), and particularly among northerly species of Violaceae.

Systematics
Four or five tribes are generally recognized in the Heliconiinae. There have been numerous attempts to sort out the phylogenetic sequence and delimitation of these, but while the former has made good progress, the latter has hitherto only achieved limited results.

Several phylogenies (and corresponding taxonomic adjustments) have been proposed, but though looking reasonable each and every one of them is only weakly supported. Even cladistic analyses of the same type of data often yield contradicting results depending on the exact method of evaluation. Ultimately, the reason is that just a fraction of the evolutionary diversity of Heliconiinae has been sampled.

What appears fairly certain is that the Argynnini and Vagrantini are closer relatives than any other two tribes of Heliconiinae. The Acraeini and Heliconiini are probably more basal lineages, but the exact placement of each respective to the other tribes cannot be considered well resolved at all.

Some tribes are distributed among several continents, resulting in a confusing phylogeography pattern. But as it seems, the apparent contradictions between systematics and biogeography are due to the premature classifications based on insufficient taxon sampling. With studies becoming more and more comprehensive, the apparent anomalies seem to sort themselves out at least for the most part. For example, the confusing distribution pattern of Acraea in the wide circumscription is apparently simply due to the bulk of this morphologically conservative group warranting recognition as genus Telchinia – it stands to note that this group has on occasion been allied with Actinote rather than Acraea, and this indeed appears to be correct.

In addition, the genus Pardopsis, often placed in the Acraeini, does almost certainly not belong there; it is now tentatively placed in the Argynnini. The relationships of the genus Cethosia (sometimes treated as a tribe of its own) are even more mysterious, and it is likely that some other genera will eventually also be moved to a different tribe as they are studied in detail. Some, like the Argynnini Argynnis, Boloria and Issoria, might be overlumped and non-monophyletic and thus some genera presently usually considered junior synonyms of them might eventually be validated like Telchinia.

Genera

Genera are presented in the presumed phylogenetic sequence. Notable species are also given if no genus article exists.

Acraeini Boisduval, 1833
 Abananote Potts, 1943
 Actinote Hübner, 1819
 Altinote Potts, 1943
 Acraea Fabricius, 1807 (paraphyletic)
 Bematistes Hemming, 1935
 Cethosia Fabricius, 1807 – lacewings
 Miyana Fruhstorfer, 1914 (tentatively placed here)

Heliconiini Swainson, 1822
 Agraulis Boisduval & Le Conte, 1835

 Dione Hübner, 1819
 Dryadula Michner, 1942 – banded orange
 Dryas Hübner, [1807] – Julia heliconian
 Eueides Hübner, 1816
 Heliconius Kluk, 1780 – brush-foot butterflies
 Philaethria Billberg, 1820
 Podotricha Michener, 1942

Vagrantini Pinratana & Eliot, 1996
 Lachnoptera Doubleday, 1847
 Phalanta Horsfield, 1829
 Smerina Hewitson, 1874
 Vindula Hemming, 1934 – cruisers
 Cirrochroa Doubleday, 1847
 Algiachroa Parsons, 1989
 Algia Herrich-Schäffer, 1864
 Terinos Boisduval, 1836
 Cupha Billberg, 1820
 Vagrans Hemming, 1934

Argynnini Duponchel, 1835
 Euptoieta Doubleday 1848
 Pardopsis Trimen, 1887 (tentatively placed here)
 Yramea Reuss 1920
 Boloria Moore, 1900 (including Clossiana)
 Issoria Hübner 1819
 Brenthis Hübner 1819
 Argynnis Fabricius 1807
 Speyeria Scudder, 1872
 Fabriciana Reuss, 1920

Footnotes

References 
  (1981). The biology of Heliconius and related genera. Annu. Rev. Entomol. 26: 427–456.  PDF fulltext
  (2004). The Butterfly Handbook: 130. Barron's Educational Series, Inc., Hauppauge, New York. 
  (2008). Markku Savela's Lepidoptera and some other life forms – Heliconiinae. Version of 2008-FEB-09. Retrieved 2008-AUG-14.
  (2008). Phylogenetic relationships of butterflies of the tribe Acraeini (Lepidoptera, Nymphalidae, Heliconiinae) and the evolution of host plant use.  Mol. Phylogenet. Evol. 46(2): 515–531.  (HTML abstract)
  (2008). Nymphalidae.net – The higher classification of Nymphalidae. Retrieved 2008-AUG-14.

Further reading
 Van Zandt Brower, A. (1994). Phylogeny of Heliconius butterflies inferred from mitochondrial DNA sequences. Mol. Phylogenet. Evol. 3:159-174. and other papers.
 Glassberg, Jeffrey Butterflies through Binoculars, The West (2001).
 Guppy, Crispin S. and Shepard, Jon H. Butterflies of British Columbia (2001).
 James, David G. and Nunnallee, David Life Histories of Cascadia Butterflies (2011).
 Pelham, Jonathan Catalogue of the Butterflies of the United States and Canada (2008).
 Pyle, Robert Michael The Butterflies of Cascadia (2002).

External links 

 Tree of Life Heliconiinae
 Heliconius Butterfly Website
 Heliconius Genomics Project
 Information about Heliconius
 Heliconius charitonia, zebra longwing on the UF / IFAS Featured Creatures Web site
 Butterflies and Moths of North America
 Butterflies of America

 
-
Butterfly subfamilies